The Dorris Apartments, located in Eugene, Oregon, are listed on the National Register of Historic Places.

See also
 National Register of Historic Places listings in Lane County, Oregon

References

1927 establishments in Oregon
Buildings and structures in Eugene, Oregon
National Register of Historic Places in Eugene, Oregon
Residential buildings completed in 1927
Apartment buildings on the National Register of Historic Places in Oregon
Tudor Revival architecture in Oregon